= Red Sound Systems =

Music Instrument manufacturers

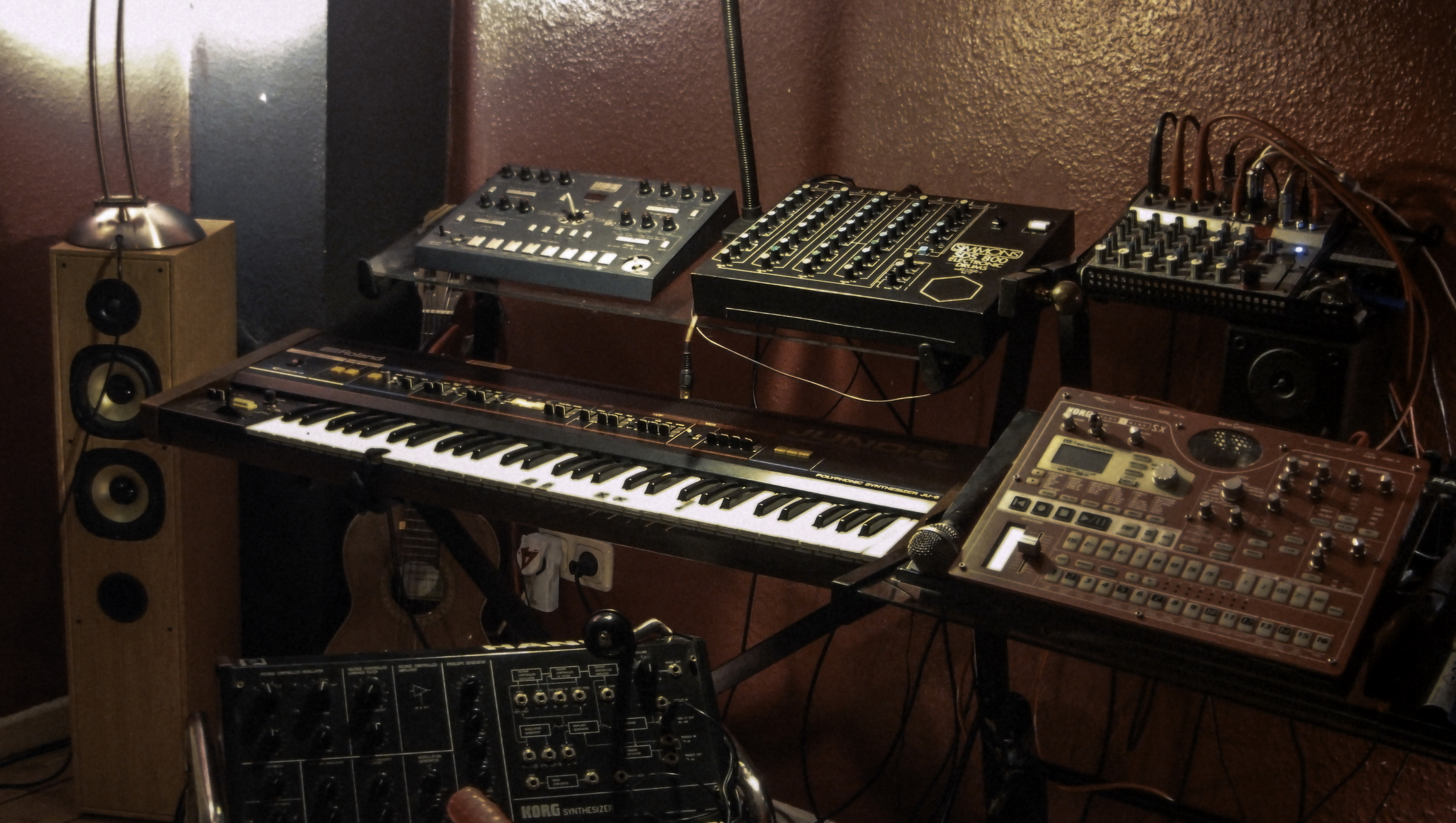
Sound equipment including a Red Sound Dark Star XP2

Red Sound Systems are a British manufacturer of music equipment. In the past, the company has manufactured the Darkstar and optional Vocoda kit, the Darkstar XP2 and Elevata synthesizers. The company has also manufactured DJ equipment such as the Federation BPM FX Pro and the Beat Xtractor1.
